David Brearley High School is a four-year comprehensive public high school that serves students in ninth through twelfth grades from Kenilworth in Union County, New Jersey, United States, operating as the lone secondary school of the Kenilworth Public Schools. The school is named for David Brearley, a signer of the United States Constitution.

Students from Winfield Township attend the school as part of a sending/receiving relationship with the Winfield Township School District.

As of the 2021–22 school year, the school had an enrollment of 766 students and 69.3 classroom teachers (on an FTE basis), for a student–teacher ratio of 11.1:1. There were 88 students (11.5% of enrollment) eligible for free lunch and 21 (2.7% of students) eligible for reduced-cost lunch.

The district participates in the Interdistrict Public School Choice Program at David Brearley High School, having been approved on November 2, 1999, as one of the first ten districts statewide to participate in the program. Each school year, slots are made available for seventh through tenth grades. Prospective Choice participants must be residents of Union County eligible for placement in grades 7-10 who were enrolled in a public school during the full year prior to entry to the Kenilworth Public Schools. Seats in the program for non-resident students are specified by the district and are allocated by lottery (if there are more applicants than available slots), with tuition paid for participating students by the New Jersey Department of Education.

History
The name David Brearley Regional High School was chosen in March 1964 by the Union County Regional High School District to honor David Brearley one of four New Jersey residents to sign the Constitution of the United States, along with Jonathan Dayton and William Livingston who had already had high schools in the district named for them. A groundbreaking ceremony was held in May 1964 for the new school facility, which would be the fourth high school in the district and was expected to be the first in the state with air conditioning and electric heating. David Brearley Middle-High School opened as the David Brearley Regional High School in June 1966 for summer school courses, after years of fighting with the Union County Regional School District to open a high school in Kenilworth. The school opened to 640 students from Kenilworth that fall. John L. Dixey served as the inaugural principal and George Cuzzolino served as the assistant principal. The original building contained 40 classrooms, an auditorium with a capacity of 820, a cafeteria with a capacity of 430, a gymnasium with a capacity of 2,000, and offices.

By 1971, the school was becoming overcrowded. The Regional Board of Education built a three-classroom portable building on the campus to address immediate overcrowding issues, and an addition was quickly planned afterward. The two-story addition, containing a special education room, business education room, two health classrooms, an expanded art room, and a large, flexible group area, opened in 1972. A second gymnasium was added to the school shortly thereafter. By 1990, however, it had become apparent that closing one of the four Regional high schools would be an efficient cost-cutting measure. Brearley had shown a sixty percent decrease in enrollment since its opening, making it a prime candidate for closure. A Save our Schools campaign was quickly formed by concerned parents with the goal of keeping Brearley open. In September 1992, the Regional Board of Education voted 7-1 to re-open talks discussing the possibility of a school closure. The following month, Regional superintendent Donald Merachnik recommended the closure of Brearley, due to its low enrollment. In early 1993, the Union County Regional Board of Education voted to close Brearley, and despite a court battle between the Committee for Concerned Parents and the Board, Brearley closed after the 1992-3 school year. Kenilworth students were sent to Jonathan Dayton High School in Springfield and Garwood students were sent to Arthur L. Johnson High School in Clark. Over the next three years, the Save our Schools committee lobbied the dissolution of the Union County Regional School District and the transfer of its four high schools to local control. A dissolution referendum was held in May 1996, the result being the dissolution of the Regional district. As such, the ownership of the David Brearley building was transferred to the Kenilworth Board of Education. In 1997, the school re-opened as the David Brearley Middle-High School. To boost enrollment, nearby Winfield began to send their high-schoolers to the school, the seventh and eighth grade moved in, and the Choice program was started to attract kids from nearby communities. In recent years, the school has added a Scholars' Academy to challenge the top students in the district, constructed a small addition to house athletic training offices, and renovated the courtyard.

In 2014, the school completed a garden and extensive mosaic mural dedicated to a former student who died while enrolled at Brearley. The mosaic was the continuation of a four-year project that has seen numerous mosaics installed inside and outside the school.

Awards, recognition and rankings
The school was the 194th-ranked public high school in New Jersey out of 339 schools statewide in New Jersey Monthly magazine's September 2014 cover story on the state's "Top Public High Schools", using a new ranking methodology. The school had been ranked 127th in the state of 328 schools in 2012, after being ranked 113th in 2010 out of 322 schools listed. The magazine ranked the school 178th in 2008 out of 316 schools. The school was ranked 162nd in the magazine's September 2006 issue, which surveyed 316 schools across the state.

Curriculum and programs
In 2001, students from David Brearley High School and Hillside High School collaborated to develop literary and art projects about bigotry presented at an exhibit, "Making Connections: Two Culturally Diverse Schools Address Prejudice and Hatred by Studying the Holocaust Together." The exhibit was presented at Kean University, and was viewed together with local Holocaust survivors and concentration camp liberators.

Athletics
The David Brearley High School Bears compete in the Union County Interscholastic Athletic Conference, which is comprised of public and private high schools in Union County and was established following a reorganization of sports leagues in Northern New Jersey by the New Jersey State Interscholastic Athletic Association (NJSIAA). Prior to the NJSIAA's 2009 realignment, the school had participated in the Mountain Valley Conference, which included public and private high schools in Essex and Union counties in northern New Jersey. With 358 students in grades 10-12, the school was classified by the NJSIAA for the 2019–20 school year as Group I for most athletic competition purposes, which included schools with an enrollment of 75 to 476 students in that grade range. The football team competes in Division 1A of the Big Central Football Conference, which includes 60 public and private high schools in Hunterdon, Middlesex, Somerset, Union and Warren counties, which are broken down into 10 divisions by size and location. The school was classified by the NJSIAA as Group I North for football for 2018–2020. School colors are navy and gold.

The school participates as the host school / lead agency in a joint cooperative wrestling team with Jonathan Dayton High School. In turn, Jonathan Dayton is the host school for joint gymnastics, ice hockey and co-ed swimming teams; the co-op ice hockey team also includes Union High School. These co-op programs operate under agreements scheduled to expire at the end of the 2023–24 school year.

Soccer
Brearley's boys soccer team won the Group I state title in 1990 (as co-champions with Haddonfield Memorial High School), 2013 (vs. New Egypt High School) and 2015 (vs. Arthur P. Schalick High School).

The 1990 team took a one-goal lead, but ended the Group I finals as co-champion after a 1–1 tie with Haddonfield.

Brearley won the Group I title in 2013 with a 3–0 win against New Egypt in the championship game played at The College of New Jersey.

The team won the Group I state championship in 2015 with a 1–0 victory over Arthur P. Schalick High School in the playoff finals. The game's lone goal came from Brearley's Justin Estremera; teammate Nick Minio shut down Schalick forward Michael D'Orio, who had scored in every tournament game until the final.

Football
Brearley's football team won the North II Group I state sectional title in 1981, 1985, 1986, 1991 and 2006.

The 1981 team finished the season with an 11–0 record after defeating Abraham Clark High School of Roselle by a score of 17-15 in the North II Group I sectional championship game.

Down 13-0 in the championship game's fourth quarter, the 1991 team mounted a comeback to defeat Mountain Lakes High School by a final score of 14-13 to win the North II Group I sectional title and finish the season with a record of 10-1.

The 2006 team defeated Verona High School by a score of 21-20  at Giants Stadium to win the North II Group I state sectional title.

Wrestling
David Brearley wrestling, operating in combination with Jonathan Dayton High School, won the 2011 Group II state championship at the Poland Spring Center in Toms River. The wrestling team won the Central Jersey Group I state sectional title in 2007 and the North Jersey Group II title in 2008-2012

Cheerleading
The girls competition cheerleading team won the Group I NJCDCA state championship title in 2003, 2004, 2006, 2007, 2008, and 2014. They are also the reigning Mountain Valley Conference Champions.

Baseball
The Brearley baseball team won its first state sectional title when it won the 2009 Central Jersey Group I state sectional championship, defeating Point Pleasant Beach High School by a score of 6-4 in the tournament final.

Administration
The school's principal is Jeremy Davies. His administration team includes the assistant principal.

Noted alumni 
 Mike Chalenski (born 1970), former professional American football defensive lineman who played for six seasons in the National Football League.
 Jack Grondin (class of 1969), drummer who was a founding member of the southern rock band 38 Special.
 Tom Perrotta (born 1961, class of 1979), novelist and screenwriter.
 Tony Siragusa (1967–2022, class of 1985), Indianapolis Colts and Baltimore Ravens defensive tackle and 'on-the-field' reporter for FOX NFL, starred in football and wrestling for David Brearley High School.

References

External links 
David Brearley High School
Kenilworth Public Schools

Data for the Kenilworth Public Schools, National Center for Education Statistics

1966 establishments in New Jersey
Educational institutions established in 1966
Kenilworth, New Jersey
Winfield Township, New Jersey
Public high schools in Union County, New Jersey